Call of the Wildman was an American reality television series that aired on Animal Planet from 2011 to 2014. The show followed the exploits of Kentucky woodsman Ernie Brown, Jr., nicknamed "The Turtleman". Aided by his friend, Neal James, and his dog, Lolly, Brown operated a nuisance animal removal business, catching and releasing nuisance animals. The series was primarily filmed near Brown's Lebanon, Kentucky, home.

Brown began catching snapping turtles from ponds near his home at the age of 7. He came to the attention of Animal Planet producers in part after an episode of Kentucky Educational Television's Kentucky Afield series that featured his bare-handed turtle-catching techniques was posted on YouTube and went viral. After personally visiting Brown and doing some initial filming, network executives decided to produce a 12-episode season of the series with the working title The Turtleman of Wild Kentucky. The title was soon changed to Call of the Wildman, a reference to Brown's distinctive yell that punctuates his actions throughout the series. The series was Animal Planet's most watched program in the fourth quarter of 2011 and was renewed for a second, 16-episode series that began airing in June 2012. In October 2012, Animal Planet re-released the series with bonus features and trivia information known as Call of the Wildman: More Live Action.

Call of the Wildman has been compared to other reality series featuring individuals from the Southern United States such as Billy the Exterminator,  Duck Dynasty, Swamp People, and Rocket City Rednecks. Because it depicts Brown's spartan existence in the backwoods of Kentucky, some poverty advocacy groups have expressed concerns that it exploits stereotypical views of Southerners as being poorly educated, poorly groomed, and impoverished. Network executives insist, however, that they have received no negative feedback about the program.

Season 4 began on August 24, 2014.

Development
In 2006, the Kentucky Educational Television series Kentucky Afield devoted a portion of their weekly hunting and fishing oriented show to Brown and his turtle catching. The segment was posted on YouTube and went viral; as of June 2012, it had garnered more than 4 million hits. Among those who viewed the videos were NASCAR drivers David Ragan and Carl Edwards; Brown credits Edwards with introducing him to an entertainment lawyer and an agent. The video and a similar one posted on the web site of the Lexington Herald-Leader newspaper also attracted the attention of television producer Matt Sharp of Sharp Entertainment. Brown relates that, while performing as a sideshow at the Mothman Festival in Point Pleasant, West Virginia, a group of executives from Sharp Entertainment and Animal Planet, who were there on an unrelated assignment, approached him about doing a television show. The executives told Brown that they had been trying to get in touch with him for over a year, but that his fellow performers had refused to deliver their messages to him.

In November 2010, Sharp sent a camera crew to film some of Brown's exploits. After seeing the footage, a producer from Animal Planet visited Brown and challenged him to "entertain [her] for 12 hours". Brown told the Herald-Leader that he took the producer on an outing in which he caught 11 turtles and a catfish. Following the producer's visit, Animal Planet decided to air a series of 12 half-hour episodes featuring Brown. Originally given the working title The Turtleman of Wild Kentucky, the name was changed to Call of the Wildman – a reference to Brown's signature yell. Brown describes the yell as "an Indian yell" and explains, "I got a quarter Shawnee and a quarter Cherokee. The other quarter is white man – that's a Yankee, Union – and another quarter is Confederate". In addition, Brown frequently uses the catchphrase "Live action!" during the series. He explains that "'Live action' means there's no faking. People have been calling me fake, and there ain't no fake. Go ahead and try it! We're doing it live action."

Premise
Despite his "Turtleman" nickname, Brown caught all types of nuisance animals on the show, including raccoons, skunks, snakes, venomous spiders, and possums. His animal catching technique is designed to protect both himself and the animal from harm. Once he captured an animal, he relocated it to a safer location in the wild. For his services, he typically only received an amount sufficient to cover the cost of gasoline to drive to and from his destination.

In each episode of Call of the Wildman, Brown was accompanied by his best friend, Neal James, and his dog, Lolly. James serves as the secretary for Brown's business, fielding telephone calls from individuals in need of his services. Lolly has been Brown's pet ever since he rescued her from wandering the streets in the aftermath of a 2009 ice storm. He doesn't know her exact breed, but he believes her to be part Border Collie and part Australian Cattle Dog. Some episodes also feature other friends who help Brown – "Turtle Team" – including handyman Jake Ison and David "Squirrel" Brady.  In some cases involving rats and the like, Brown also enlisted the help of a rat snake that lived on or near his property, Sir Lancelot.  The snake died of unknown causes, possibly old age, in an episode aired in late 2014.

After a seven-month investigation, Mother Jones published an exposé of the show which includes testimony and supporting evidence that the crew obtained an opossum from a wildlife rescue in order to fake a supposed wildlife infestation at a fraternity house in Lexington, and that an infant raccoon died from an apparent lack of appropriate food and medical care after being in the possession of Ernie Brown for several days amongst numerous other actions alleged against Brown and crew.

Reception
A 2012 press release from Animal Planet announced that Call of the Wildman was the network's most popular show in the fourth quarter of 2011, garnering almost 780,000 viewers, and had been renewed for a second season consisting of 16 episodes, including a special episode to air during the network's "Monster Week". The release further noted that, in the second season, the show would film in locations other than Kentucky, naming Louisiana as an example. The episode "Baby Mama Drama", which aired July 8, 2012, set a record for the show's largest audience ever, an estimated 1.6 million, according to the network.

The popularity of Call of the Wildman has prompted Brown's appearance on several television programs, including two visits to The Tonight Show. Shortly after telling his hometown newspaper, the Lebanon Enterprise that he wanted to meet CNN news anchor Anderson Cooper, Brown was invited to appear on an episode of Cooper's show, Anderson Cooper 360°. He told the paper he still has a dream of being on the cover of Rolling Stone.

Associated Press writer Dylan Lovan pointed out that Call of the Wildman was part of a growing number of similarly themed reality shows that included Animal Planet's Hillbilly Handfishin', A&E's Billy the Exterminator, Duck Dynasty, History's Swamp People. The Washington Post'''s Roger Catlin pointed out that many of the shows feature individuals from the Southern United States and include pejorative terms like "redneck" and "hillbilly" in their titles; in addition to "Hillbilly Handfishin'", he cited National Geographic Channel's Rocket City Rednecks and CMT's My Big Redneck Vacation. Lovan noted that "Brown fits the mold of the distinct Southern characters who populate cable TV", noting that he lives in a small home with no television or phone service, is missing his front teeth, and carries a foot-long Bowie knife he nicknamed "Thunder".

Ted Ownby of the Center for the Study of Southern Culture stated that he believes producers of shows such as Call of the Wildman "build on preexisting stereotypes, so they don't need to build characters", and added that "people of the South get frustrated at the narrow range of representations [of them]". Dee Davis, president of the Center for Rural Strategies, expressed his concern that the shows approach "the thin line between an honest documentary and exploitative reality show". Animal Planet president Marjorie Kaplan insisted, "We haven't received any negative response at all" to the show. Commenting on the potential for the show to advance negative stereotypes of Southerners, Animal Planet executive Dawn Sinsel added, "As with all shows that explore a subculture of America that people might not be familiar with, we're careful to make sure that we represent the talent in their true colors and not 'cover up' their natural character. Turtleman likes to catch all types of animals. We hope Ernie's carefree and loyal personality and love of animals will replace any stereotypes." Brown himself commented "You either like the show and watch it, or you don't. I'm not doing anything wrong, just cheering people up."

Controversy and aftermath
Critics of the series alleged that the scenarios and animal catching scenes featured on the show were scripted and faked using appropriated animals instead of naturally occurring events. Karen Bailey, founder of the Kentucky Wildlife Center, said that a 2012 episode of the show featuring Brown rescuing a family of raccoons trapped in a laundry room actually featured a male raccoon as the mother and baby raccoons obtained from two different locations. Following the episode, Bailey said the animals used for filming were brought to the center, where one of the babies died.

The premiere episode of the show's second season featured Brown removing two cottonmouth snakes from a public pool in Danville, Kentucky. After the show aired, the director of the Kentucky Reptile Zoo, Jim Harrison, stated that cottonmouths are not indigenous to the area where the scene was filmed and that the snakes must have been brought in for the show's filming; Animal Planet representatives denied the claim. The city later investigated and concluded that the snakes were placed in the pool by the show's crew, and that neither the crew nor the city parks department obtained the required approvals to do so.

Following the airing of the episode "Deer Destruction" in 2013, the Kentucky Department of Fish and Wildlife sent Brown a letter to remind him that his Nuisance Wildlife Control Officer (NWCO) permit did not allow him to handle deer. The department warned that any future violations could result in the revocation of his permit, a citation, or both. Brown's last NWCO license expired in February 2014, and the department refused to renew it because he had not fully documented his captures in 2013.

On January 21, 2014, the magazine Mother Jones alleged that Brown appeared to have falsified records submitted to the Kentucky Department of Fish and Wildlife about what was captured, released, and euthanized on Call of the Wildman''. Both the Humane Society of the United States (HSUS) and People for the Ethical Treatment of Animals (PETA) demanded an investigation by the United States Department of Agriculture (USDA) regarding the allegations. In 2017, a USDA investigation concluded that the show exhibited a coyote, porcupines, raccoons, bats, armadillos and deer without a valid license in violation of the Animal Welfare Act. The main producer was fined $180,000, while an unnamed producer for the show was fined $1,800 for the violations.

After Brown lost his license, the show went off the air, but Brown and James continued to post animal rescue videos to YouTube and Facebook. James died on February 1, 2019, at age 55 from natural causes.

Episodes
Re-runs of episodes are enhanced with facts and trivia with behind-the-scenes information, and even additional scenes. These are called "More Live Action" episodes.

Season 1

Season 2

Season 3

Season 4

References

Bibliography

 he also had a mental breakdown 09

External links

2011 American television series debuts
2014 American television series endings
Animal Planet original programming
Lebanon, Kentucky
Television shows set in Kentucky
2010s American reality television series
Television shows filmed in Kentucky